Daniel House may refer to:
Daniel House (musician) (born 1961), American musician and entrepreneur
Daniel House (Knoxville, Tennessee), historic U.S. home

See also
Danuel House (born 1993), American basketball player
Danielle House (born 1976), Canadian beauty pageant winner
Daniels House (disambiguation)
Danny House, Grade I listed building in West Sussex, England